Sacred cow(s) may refer to:

Sacred cow (idiom), something considered (perhaps unreasonably) immune to question or criticism

Religion and mythology
Cattle in religion and mythology, object of reverence, including:
Sacred bull, including ancient religions
Bull of Heaven in Sumerian mythology
Auðumbla and Gavaevodata, the primeval cows of Norse and Zoroastrian mythology
Tauroctony, the ritual bull-slaying of Mithraism
Red heifer, a sacred sacrifice in Judaism
Apis, the Egyptian sacred bull

Arts and entertainment
Sacred Cow (album), by Geggy Tah, 1996
Sacred Cows, an album by the Swirling Eddies, 1996
"Sacred Cow" (Bob's Burgers), a 2011 TV episode
Sacred Cow Productions, an American film company
Sacred Cow Films, a beneficiary of South Australian Film Corporation's 2009 FilmLab initiative
Sacred Cows: A Lighthearted Look at Belief and Tradition Around the World, a 2015 book by Seth Andrews

Other uses
Air Force One, first dubbed Sacred Cow, the official U.S. presidential aircraft

See also

Holy cow (disambiguation)
The Sacred Chao, a fundamental element of Discordianism
Sacred Chao, a side project of members of the band Living Death

ar:بقرة مقدسة
de:Heilige Kuh
fr:Vache sacrée
he:פרה קדושה
ka:წმინდა ძროხა
new:गौशाला
pl:Święta krowa
pt:Vaca sagrada
ru:Священная корова
simple:Sacred cow
fi:Pyhä lehmä
sv:Helig ko